Hugh Bullard (16 March 1942 – 16 February 2008) was a Bahamian sprinter. He competed in the men's 400 metres at the 1960 Summer Olympics.

References

1942 births
2008 deaths
Athletes (track and field) at the 1960 Summer Olympics
Bahamian male sprinters
Olympic athletes of the Bahamas
Sportspeople from Nassau, Bahamas